Jorge Franco may refer to:

 Jorge Franco (fencer) (1923–1989), Portuguese fencer
 Jorge Franco (footballer), Spanish footballer
 Jorge Franco (writer) (born 1962), writer from Colombia
 Jorge Fernando Franco (born 1971), Mexican politician